Daniel Pedro Killer (born 21 December 1949) is an Argentine former football defender who was part of the Argentina squad that won the 1978 FIFA World Cup. Daniel and his brother Mario were part of the Rosario Central team that won the Primera Division Argentina Nacional championship of 1973.

Killer started his career in 1970 with his home town club; Rosario Central where he was joined by his brother Mario in 1972.

Daniel's other clubs included Racing Club   Vélez Sársfield, Estudiantes de Río Cuarto, Unión in Argentina. Killer also played for Rosario Central's fiercest local rivals, Newell's Old Boys.

Daniel Killer also had a short spell in Colombia with Bucaramanga, he finished his career in the lower leagues with Argentino de Rosario.

He owns and manages a small indoor soccer complex on the west side of his hometown.

Honours
 Rosario Central
Primera Division Argentina: Nacional 1971, Nacional 1973
 Argentina
FIFA World Cup: 1978

References

External links

 
 
 
 
  

Argentine footballers
Argentina international footballers
Association football defenders
Rosario Central footballers
Racing Club de Avellaneda footballers
Newell's Old Boys footballers
Club Atlético Vélez Sarsfield footballers
Estudiantes de Río Cuarto footballers
Unión de Santa Fe footballers
Atlético Bucaramanga footballers
Expatriate footballers in Colombia
Footballers from Rosario, Santa Fe
1978 FIFA World Cup players
1975 Copa América players
FIFA World Cup-winning players
1949 births
Living people
Argentine people of German descent
Argentine Primera División players
Categoría Primera A players
Argentino de Rosario footballers